Nana Mizuki Live Rainbow at Budokan is the 3rd live DVD release from J-pop star and voice actress Nana Mizuki. It has two discs, Rainbow Disc and Document Disc.

Rainbow Disc

Contains 8th concert Live Rainbow at Budokan which marked her first performance in Nippon Budokan. She is the second voice actress to perform a personal concert in Budokan, after Shiina Hekiru.

OPENING
JET PARK
still in the groove
FAKE ANGEL
New Sensation
MC1
The place of happiness

JUMP！
MC2

Open Your Heart
innocent starter
Tears’ Night
Independent Love Song
Brilliant Star
It’s in the bag
Take a shot
Power Gate
Transmigration
MC3

PROTECTION
MC4 encore

MC5 (a cappella)
end roll

Document Disc

Contains digested footage of her Summer tour Nana Mizuki Live Spark (7th tour) and special features.

Love’s Wonderland
,  (medley)
climb up

Private Emotion ～New Frontier
in a fix

Heartbeat
cherish
What cheer？

Special features

Live Spark Rehearsal
Road to Budokan

External links
 Information on official website

Nana Mizuki video albums
Live video albums
Albums recorded at the Nippon Budokan
2005 video albums